Alexandru Iacob (born 14 April 1989) is a Romanian footballer who plays as a centre back for Liga II club Minaur Baia Mare.

Career
Iacob attended the Iancu de Hunedoara National College in his native city, Hunedoara, graduating in 2007. He began his football career playing at Corvinul Hunedoara youngsters. In 2005, he moved to the senior team, where he played 41 games and scored a goal. Iacob is also the captain of U-17 Romania national football team. In 2007, he signed with Steaua București.

On 6 August 2009 played his first match in Steaua's shirt in Europa League against Motherwell F.C., Steaua won away with 3–1. In January 2010, Iacob was demoted to the B squad.

Honours
Steaua II București
Liga III: 2008–09
Rapid București
Liga III: 2018–19
Liga IV – Bucharest: 2017–18

Notes 
 The 2008–2009 Liga III appearances and goals made for Steaua II București are unavailable.

References

External links
 
 

1989 births
Living people
Sportspeople from Hunedoara
Romanian footballers
Romania youth international footballers
Association football defenders
Liga I players
Liga II players
Liga III players
FC Steaua București players
FC Gloria Buzău players
ASC Oțelul Galați players
FC Rapid București players
CS Corvinul Hunedoara players
FC Steaua II București players
FC Delta Dobrogea Tulcea players
CS Luceafărul Oradea players
CS Mioveni players
CS Minaur Baia Mare (football) players
Cypriot First Division players
Cypriot Second Division players
Ethnikos Achna FC players
Pafos FC players
Romanian expatriate footballers
Romanian expatriate sportspeople in Cyprus
Expatriate footballers in Cyprus